Reborn to Kill Again is an album by the American metalcore band Overcast, which was released on August 19, 2008. It contains eleven classic tracks and two unreleased songs.

"Root Bound Apollo" was first released on Shadows Fall's Of One Blood.

Track listing

Credits

Overcast
Brian Fair ― vocals
Scott McCooe ― lead guitar
Pete Cortese ― rhythm guitar
Mike D'Antonio ― bass guitar
Jay Fitzgerald ― drums

References

2008 albums
Overcast (band) albums